Walker Building, Walker Company or Walker Factory, may refer to:

J. W. Walker Building-Central Arizona Light & Power, Phoenix, Arizona, listed on the NRHP in Phoenix, Arizona
Walker Body Company Factory, Amesbury, Massachusetts, listed on the NRHP in Essex County, Massachusetts
 Walker Building (Springfield, Massachusetts), listed on the NRHP in Hampden County, Massachusetts
Walker and Weeks Office Building, Cleveland, Ohio, listed on the National Register of Historic Places listings in Cleveland, Ohio
Walker Building (Stillwater, Oklahoma), listed on the NRHP in Payne County, Oklahoma
Walker Bank Building, Salt Lake City, Utah, listed on the NRHP in Salt Lake City, Utah
Walker Apartment Hotel, Tacoma, Washington, listed on the National Register of Historic Places in Pierce County, Washington
Walker Cut Stone Company, Wilkeson, Washington, listed on the National Register of Historic Places in Pierce County, Washington

See also
Walker House (disambiguation)